Kapitan Borchardt is a Polish sail training ship built in 1918, named after Karol Olgierd Borchardt.
"Kapitan Borchardt" is the oldest sailing ship currently flying the Polish flag. Launched in the Netherlands in 1918 and named "Nora", the ship was initially used as an ocean-going cargo vessel before being converted to a training ship in Sweden in 1989. Kapitan Borchardt - then named "Najaden" - became a Polish vessel in 2011 when it was purchased from the vessel's former owner.

References

Individual sailing vessels
Tall ships of Poland
Ships built in the Netherlands
1918 ships
Schooners
Sail training ships
Training ships of Poland